Sassamansville (SAS-a-minz-vil) is an unincorporated community in northwestern Montgomery County, Pennsylvania, United States on Hoffmansville Road, approximately 1 1/2 miles northwest of Route 663. It is located mainly in New Hanover Township, but also in Douglass Township and is served by the Boyertown Area School District. It is drained by the Swamp Creek into the Perkiomen Creek. The Sassamansville telephone exchange uses area code 610. While the village has its own box post office with the zip code of 19472, portions of Sassamansville are served by the Barto, Gilbertsville, and Perkiomenville post offices with zip codes of 19504, 19525, and 18074, respectively. The community is home to The Bauman Family fruit butter factory.

Gallery

References

Unincorporated communities in Montgomery County, Pennsylvania
Unincorporated communities in Pennsylvania